Habtamu Wondimu is professor of social psychology in the College of Education of Addis Ababa University, Ethiopia. In 2007-2008 he was part of the Fulbright New Century Scholars Program.

References

Year of birth missing (living people)
Living people
Academic staff of Addis Ababa University
Ethiopian social scientists
Social psychologists